Tomokazu Matsuyama (松山智一 Matsuyama Tomokazu, born April 30, 1976, in Takayama, Gifu, Japan) is a Japanese-American contemporary visual artist. Matsuyama lives and works in Brooklyn, New York.

Matsuyama is influenced by a variety of subjects, including Japanese art from the Edo and Meiji eras, classical Greek and Roman statuary, French Renaissance painting, postwar contemporary art, and the visual language of global, popular culture as embodied by mass-produced commodities.

Education and career 
After graduating Sophia University, Tokyo, Matsuyama moved to New York and attended Pratt Institute in Brooklyn, where he received his MFA in Communications Design in 2004.<div>Matsuyama’s important exhibitions include the Reischauer Institute at Harvard University, Massachusetts, the Katzen Arts Center at American University Museum, Washington D.C., Museum of Contemporary Art Australia, Sydney, the Japan Society, New York, the Minneapolis Institute of Arts, Minneapolis, Marianne Boesky Gallery, New York, among other galleries and institutions. His work can also be seen in the permanent collections of Asian Art Museum of San Francisco, Microsoft Collection, the Cosmopolitan Hotel Group (NV), the Royal Family (Dubai, UAE), and The Standard Hotel (Andre Balazs Group), among others. In August 2014, Matsuyama was awarded the Harbour City Gallery Public Art Commission in Hong Kong.

From 2012 to May 2017, Matsuyama was an adjunct professor at the School of Visual Arts in NYC.

Exhibitions 
2021

 Summertime, Zidoun-Bossuyt Gallery, Luxembourg
 Nature Morte, The Hole, New York, NY

 Accountable Nature, Long Museum, Chongqing, China 

2020
 Accountable Nature, Long Museum, Shanghai, China

2018
 No Place Like Home, Zidoun-Bossuyt Gallery, Luxembourg City, Luxembourg 
 Same Same, Different, Lumine Zero, Shinjuku, Japan 

2017
 Oh Magic Night, HOCA Foundation (Hong Kong Contemporary Art), Hong Kong

2015
 Somewhere Here, Zidoun-Bossuyt Gallery, Luxembourg
 17 Hours, Museum of Contemporary Art Australia, Sydney, Australia 
 Come with me, Gallery Wendi Norri, San Francisco, CA

2014
 Sky is the Limit, Harbour City, Hong Kong 
 Out Side Looking In, Lesley Kehoe Galleries, Melbourne, Australia

2013
 Palimpsest, Harvard University, Reischauer Institute, Cambridge, Boston 
 The Standard Rendezvous, Zidoun Gallery, Luxembourg

2012
 New Works, Mark Moore Gallery, Los Angeles, CA 
 The Future Is Always Bright, Frey Norris Gallery, San Francisco, CA 
 Thousand Regards, Katzen Art Center, American University Museum, Washington DC

2011
 East Weets Mest, Joshua Liner Gallery, New York, NY

2010
 In Case You're Lost, Frey Norris Gallery, San Francisco, CA

2009
 Glancing at the Twin Peak, Joshua Liner Gallery, New York, NY

2007
 Polarize, FIFTY24SF Gallery in San Francisco, CA
 Between the Polar, Takuro Someya Contemporary Art, Kashiwa, Chica, Japan

2006
 Matzu-MTP Expo, Gallery SPEAK FOR, Tokyo, Japan

References

External links 
 Tomokazu Matsuyama Official Website
 http://www.zidoun-bossuyt.com/artist-matsuyama-tomokazu.htm

1976 births
Living people
Artists from Gifu Prefecture
Japanese contemporary artists
Japanese painters